Rika de Vries  (born ) is a Dutch female Paralympic sitting volleyball player. She is part of the Netherlands women's national sitting volleyball team.

She competed at the 2008 Summer Paralympics finishing third, and also at the 2012 Summer Paralympics finishing 4th, after losing from Ukraine in the bronze medal match. On club level she played for Kindercentrum/Alterno in 2012.

See also
 Netherlands at the 2012 Summer Paralympics

References

External links 
 http://www.zimbio.com/photos/Karin+Van+Der+Haar/Rika+De+Vries/2012+London+Paralympics+Day+9+Sitting+Volleyball/GInTKPhRmah

1974 births
Living people
Dutch sitting volleyball players
Dutch women's volleyball players
Medalists at the 2008 Summer Paralympics
Paralympic volleyball players of the Netherlands
People from Voorst 
Volleyball players at the 2008 Summer Paralympics
Volleyball players at the 2012 Summer Paralympics
Women's sitting volleyball players
Paralympic medalists in volleyball
Paralympic bronze medalists for the Netherlands
Sportspeople from Gelderland